American Ninja 4: The Annihilation is a 1991 American martial arts action film starring Michael Dudikoff, David Bradley, and James Booth. A sequel to American Ninja 3: Blood Hunt (1989), it is the fourth installment in the American Ninja franchise, followed by American Ninja V and was directed by Cedric Sundstrom. The film marked Michael Dudikoff's final appearance in the American Ninja franchise.

Plot
A Delta Force unit attempts to escape from a pursuing group of ninja in a foreign country but most are killed and the rest are captured. The secret Ninja Army is headed by Colonel Scarf Mulgrew) an ex-British policeman and anti-American who has joined with Shiekh Ali Maksood, a Muslim militant, who plans to bring a suitcase nuke to New York. Mulgrew threatens to burn the commandos alive and use the nuke unless he is paid a ransom of 50 million dollars. Agents Sean Davidson and Carl Brackston are sent on a covert mission to rescue the prisoners and defeat the terrorists.

Sean and Carl parachute in and meet their contact Pango. While gathering information from a local operative named Freddie, they are confronted by Mulgrew and the corrupt local police headed by O'Reilly. Freddie is killed by Mulgrew but Sean, Carl, and Pango escape. Pango takes them to Dr. Sarah a Peace Corps nurse who hides them from the police. Soon after ninjas attack, capturing Sean, Carl and Sarah alive while Pango escapes, and imprisoning them in an old British fort to be tortured by Mulgrew. Mulgrew assaults Sarah and later it is revealed Mulgrew killed her father.

Joe Armstrong, a special forces commando now working as a teacher with the Peace Corps, is finally persuaded to help rescue his friend, Sean, and the others. Joe convinces the local rebel group known as Sulphur Springs, a former penal colony led by Dr. Tamba, to join them and they steal engineering plans to the fort. Joe enters the fort stealthily and rescues Sean, Carl, Sarah and most of the commandos as they are being executed while Sulphur Springs also attacks the fort. Maksood's helicopter carrying the bomb is destroyed by Carl, Mulgrew is killed by Sean, and the Super Ninja is killed by Joe. Joe bids goodbye to Dr. Tamba and to Sean saying he will be at the school before walking away through heaps of dead ninjas and the debris of the destroyed fort.

Cast

 Michael Dudikoff as Agent Joe Armstrong
 David Bradley as Agent Sean Davidson
 Dwayne Alexandre as Agent Carl Brackston
 Robin Stille as Dr. Sarah
 Ken Gampu as Dr. Tamba
 James Booth as Colonel Scarf Mulgrew
 Ron Smerczak as Shiekh Ali Maksood
 Frantz Dobrowsky as Captain O'Reilly
 Kely McClung as Super Ninja
 Jody Abrahams as Pango
 Anthony Fridjhon as Freddie / Treddle
 David Sherwood as Gavin
 Sean Kelly as Norris
 Jamie Bartlett as Segal
 John Pasternak as Carlos
 Robin B. Smith as Schultz
 Shane Safi as Little Special School Child

References

External links
 
 
 American Ninja 4: The Annihilation at the Disobiki
 
 

1991 films
1990s action films
1991 martial arts films
American action films
American martial arts films
Films about Delta Force
1990s English-language films
Ninja films
Golan-Globus films
American Ninja
1990s American films